FC Phoenix Banjë (previously known as KF Onix Banjë) is a professional football club from Kosovo which competes in the First League. The club is based in Banja of Peja. Their home ground is the Stadiumi "Tahir Vokshi" which has a seating capacity of 1,500.

See also
 List of football clubs in Kosovo

References

Football clubs in Kosovo
Association football clubs established in 2013
Sport in Peja